is a Japanese footballer currently playing as a midfielder for Vanraure Hachinohe.

Career statistics

Club
.

Notes

References

External links

1993 births
Living people
Japanese footballers
Association football midfielders
Japan Football League players
J3 League players
ReinMeer Aomori players
Vanraure Hachinohe players